Admiral Sir Charles Ekins GCB (1768 – 2 July 1855) was an officer of the Royal Navy who served in the Fourth Anglo-Dutch War, the French Revolutionary and Napoleonic Wars, and rose to the rank of admiral.

Life
Ekins was the son of Dr. Jeffery Ekins, dean of Carlisle, and nephew of Dr. John Ekins, dean of Salisbury (1768–1809), and was born presumably at Quainton, Buckinghamshire, where his father was then rector. He entered the Royal Navy in March 1781, on board the 74-gun , under the command of the Hon. Keith Stewart.

After continuous service on the Mediterranean and home stations for the next eight years, he was promoted to the rank of lieutenant on 20 October 1790. During the next five years he was mainly employed in the West Indies. Early in 1795 he came home in the 98-gun , bearing the flag of Sir John Jervis, and was in her when she was burnt at Spithead on 1 May. He returned to England in command of Havik, one of the Dutch prizes taken at the capitulation of Saldanha Bay. After his return to Britain, he was advanced to post rank 22 December 1796.

In August 1797 he was appointed to the 28-gun HMS Amphitrite, and in her was actively employed in the West Indies until March 1801, when, after a severe attack of yellow fever, he was sent home with despatches. From 1804 to 1806 he commanded the 40-gun ; and from 1806 to 1811 the 74-gun , in which he took part in the expedition against Copenhagen in 1807, in the operations on the coast of Portugal in 1808, and in the Baltic cruise of 1809. In September 1815 he commissioned the 74-gun , and commanded her in the bombardment of Algiers, on 27 August 1816, when he was wounded. He later, together with the other captains engaged, was nominated a Companion of the Bath, and by the King of the Netherlands a knight 3rd class of the Order of William of the Netherlands.

Superb was paid off in October 1818, and Ekins had no further service afloat; though he became in course of seniority rear-admiral on 12 August 1819, vice-admiral on 22 July 1830, and admiral on 23 November 1841; and was made a Knight Commander of the Bath on 8 June 1831, and a Knight Grand Cross of the Bath on 7 April 1852. He died at 69 Cadogan Place, London on 2 July 1855. He married, in 1800, Priscilla, daughter of Thomas Parlby (1727–1802) of Stone Hall, Plymouth, Devon.

Works
Ekins was the author of Naval Battles of Great Britain from the Accession of the illustrious House of Hanover to the Battle of Navarin reviewed (1824; 2nd edit. 1828). He wrote also a pamphlet on the round stem controversy in the form of a letter to Sir Robert Seppings (1824), and developed a system of maritime signalling (London: Thomas Curson Hansard, 1838).

See also

References

1768 births
1855 deaths
Royal Navy admirals
Knights Grand Cross of the Order of the Bath
Royal Navy personnel of the Fourth Anglo-Dutch War
Royal Navy personnel of the American Revolutionary War
Royal Navy personnel of the French Revolutionary Wars
Royal Navy personnel of the Napoleonic Wars
Knights Third Class of the Military Order of William
Royal Navy personnel of the Bombardment of Algiers (1816)